Oliver Grant may refer to:
 Oliver Grant (rugby union), Scottish rugby union player
 Oliver "Power" Grant, American entrepreneur, producer, streetwear clothing mogul and actor